Andrei Iosivas (born October 15, 1999) is an American football wide receiver for the Princeton Tigers.

Early life and high school
Iosivas grew up in Honolulu, Hawaii and attended the Punahou School.

College career
Iosivas played on Princeton's junior varsity team as a freshman. As a sophomore, he caught 18 passes for 263 yards and four touchdowns. Iosivas's initial junior season in 2020 was canceled due to Covid-19 and he took a gap year. In 2021, he caught 41 passes for 703 yards and five touchdowns and was named second-team All-Ivy League. Iosivas entered his senior season as the 15th-most athletic player in college football on sportswriter Bruce Feldman's annual "Freaks List". He was named first team All-Ivy League after leading the conference with 66 receptions, 943 receiving yards, and seven touchdown catches.

Iosivas is also a heptathlete on Princeton's track and field team. He set the school record with 5,715 points in 2022 and was named an All-American.

References

External links
Princeton Tigers football bio

Living people
American football wide receivers
Princeton Tigers football players
Princeton Tigers men's track and field athletes
Players of American football from Hawaii
Year of birth missing (living people)